Alfred Sutter (born 20 May 1906, date of death unknown) was a Swiss athlete. He competed in the men's long jump at the 1928 Summer Olympics.

References

1906 births
Year of death missing
Athletes (track and field) at the 1928 Summer Olympics
Swiss male long jumpers
Olympic athletes of Switzerland
Place of birth missing